Jonathan Miller, professionally known as James Dece (born February 27, 1982) is an American music producer known for producing dubstep and other genres of electronic music.

Life and career 
Born in Milwaukee, WI on February 27, 1982, James Dece attended and graduated from Northeastern University with a degree in Bachelor of Arts and Science (BAS).

James Dece began releasing Electro House music in 2018 with Plasmapool Music Group labels such as TRXX, NOIZE, and FUTURETRXX. As his music production expanded out to more genres of bass music, some of his more notable releases would be with Play Me Records, Most Addictive and FiXT Music.

James Dece music productions charted as number #25 on Beatport Dubstep Chart.

Recognitions 
 Beatport Best New Dubstep: November 2021
 Beatport Closing Essentials 2021
 Beatport Best New Electro House: March 2021
 Artist of the Week EDM Sauce December 2020

Discography

Albums, Singles and EPs

References

1982 births
Living people
American record producers
American musicians